The 1996 NCAA Division I women's soccer tournament was the 15th annual single-elimination tournament to determine the national champion of NCAA Division I women's collegiate soccer. The semifinals and championship game were played at Buck Shaw Stadium in Santa Clara, California during December 1996.

North Carolina defeated Notre Dame in the final, 1–0 (in two overtimes), to win their thirteenth national title. Coached by Anson Dorrance, the Tar Heels finished the season 27–0–1. North Carolina returned to the championship after appearing in all thirteen finals prior to 1995. 

The most outstanding offensive player was Debbie Keller from North Carolina, and the most outstanding defensive player was Nel Fettig, also from North Carolina. Keller and Fettig, along with eleven other players, were named to the All-tournament team.

The tournament's leading scorers, with 5 goals each, were Danielle Fotopoulous from Florida and Amy Van Laacke from Notre Dame.

Qualification

All Division I women's soccer programs were eligible to qualify for the tournament. The tournament field expanded again, increasing from 24 to 32 teams, and for the third time in the previous five years.

Eleven conferences sent automatic bids to the tournament, accompanied by twenty-one at-large bids.

Records

Bracket

All-tournament team
Justi Baumgardt, Portland
Mandy Clemens, Santa Clara
Robin Confer, North Carolina
Lorrie Fair, North Carolina
Nel Fettig, North Carolina (most outstanding defensive player)
Jen Grubb, Notre Dame
Regina Holan, Portland
Debbie Keller, North Carolina (most outstanding offensive player)
Jennifer Lalor, Santa Clara
Cindy Parlow, North Carolina
Jen Renola, Notre Dame
Laurie Schwoy, North Carolina
Jenny Streiffer, Notre Dame

See also 
 NCAA Division II Women's Soccer Championship
 NCAA Division III Women's Soccer Championship

References

NCAA
 
NCAA Women's Soccer Championship
NCAA Division I Women's Soccer Tournament
NCAA Division I Women's Soccer Tournament
NCAA Division I Women's Soccer Tournament
Women's sports in California